Clifford Brown All Stars (also released as Caravan) is an album by American jazz trumpeter Clifford Brown featuring tracks recorded in 1954 but released on the EmArcy label posthumously in 1956.

Reception

AllMusic awarded the album 3 stars and Stewart Mason, in his review, states "While nowhere close to bottom-of-the-barrel scrapings, these are clearly inferior performances".

Track listing
 "Caravan" (Irving Mills, Juan Tizol, Duke Ellington) – 15:10   
 "Autumn in New York" (Vernon Duke) – 21:35

Personnel 
Clifford Brown – trumpet
Herb Geller, Joe Maini – alto saxophone
Walter Benton – tenor saxophone 
Kenny Drew – piano
Curtis Counce – bass
Max Roach – drums

References 

1956 albums
Clifford Brown albums
EmArcy Records albums